is a private university in Yamashina, Kyoto, Japan.

In 2005, the university became co-educational. In March 2017, the university had approximately 4,000 students.

External links
 Kyoto Tachibana University Website (English version)

Private universities and colleges in Japan
Universities and colleges in Kyoto Prefecture